Theora is a genus of saltwater and freshwater clams, bivalve molluscs in the family Semelidae.

Species
Species accepted as of October 2021:

Theora alfredensis 
Theora iridescens 
Theora lata 
Theora lubrica 
Theora mesopotamica 
Theora moulinsii 
Theora nasuta 
Theora opalina 
Theora translucens 
Synonyms
 Theora cadabra (Eames & Wilkins, 1957) accepted as Theora mesopotamica (Annandale, 1918) (junior synonym)
 Theora fragilis (A. Adams, 1856) accepted as Theora lata (Hinds, 1843)
 Theora hindsiana Preston, 1916 accepted as Theora iridescens (Hinds, 1843)
 Theora nitida Gould, 1861 accepted as Theora lata (Hinds, 1843)
 Theora ovalis E. A. Smith, 1904 accepted as Aligena ovalis (E. A. Smith, 1904) (original combination)

References

 Vaught, K.C.; Abbott, R.T.; Boss, K.J. (1989). A classification of the living Mollusca. American Malacologists: Melbourne. ISBN 0-915826-22-4. XII, 195 pp

External links
  
 Adams, H. & Adams, A. (1853-1858). The genera of Recent Mollusca; arranged according to their organization. London, van Voorst. Vol. 1: xl + 484 pp.; vol. 2: 661 pp.; vol. 3: 138 pls.
 Adams, A. (1864). On the species of Nearea found in the seas of Japan. Annals and Magazine of Natural History. (3) 13: 206-209
 Stoliczka F. (1870-1871). The Pelecypoda, with a review of all known genera of this class, fossil and recent. [in T. Oldham, Paleontologia Indica, being figures and descriptions of the organic remains procured during the progress of the Geological Survey of India. Cretaceous Fauna of Southern India. Volume 3. Memoirs of the Geological Survey of India, Calcutta. pp. i-xxii, 1-537, pl. 1-50]

Semelidae
Bivalve genera